Oiorhinus is a genus of parasitoid wasps belonging to the family Ichneumonidae.

The species of this genus are found in Europe.

Species:
 Oiorhinus pallipalpis Wesmael, 1845

References

Ichneumonidae
Ichneumonidae genera